Maa Da Ladla is an Indian Punjabi comedy film directed by Uday Pratap Singh. The film was initially released on 16 September 2022 in India and USA.

Plot 
The story revolves around three characters: Gora, Sehaj and Kevin. Gora is a struggling actor while Sehaj is a single mother who lives with her son Kevin. Sehaj hires Gora to play Kevin's father. Will everything go according to plan?

Cast 

 Tarsem Jassar as Gora
 Neeru Bajwa as Sehaj
 Iftikhar Thakur as Chacha
 Naseem Vicky as Bagga
 Qaiser Piya as doctor
 Olivia McGuinness as School teacher
 Nirmal Rishi
 Roopi Gill
 Praveen Kumar Aawara as Money Lander

Music 
The music of the film is composed by Rao Inderjeet Singh. Wazir Patar and Tarsem Jassar are the playback singers.

Release 
The film was originally released on 16 September 2022 in India and United States of America and also released in France on 23 September 2022.

References

External links 

2022 films
Punjabi-language Indian films
Indian black comedy films